Ndejje University Football Club, also Ndejje UFC, are a Ugandan University football club from Ndejje, in Luwero District. They have mostly played in the second division of Ugandan football but appeared in the top flight for the 2018–19 season.

The club is affiliated with Ndejje University, the second Ugandan team in the Uganda Premier League to be affiliated with an educational institution after Kirinya–Jinja Senior Secondary School FC now Busoga United, which is affiliated with Jinja Senior Secondary School.

History
Ndejje were one of the founding clubs of the FUFA Big League in 2009.

Ndejje were promoted to the Uganda Premier League after winning the Elgon group and their promotion from the FUFA Big League in the 2017/2018 football season.

The Students were relegated after one season in the top flight after losing 1–0 to Onduparaka FC on the second to last matchday of the 2019 season.

Honours
FUFA Big League Champions, 2017–18

References

Football clubs in Uganda
Luweero District
University and college association football clubs